Lyndon Baines Johnson Memorial Grove on the Potomac is located on Lady Bird Johnson Park (formerly known as Columbia Island), in Washington, D.C. The presidential memorial honors the 36th President of the United States, Lyndon B. Johnson.

The grove consists of two parts. The first area, commemorative in nature, is a Texas granite monolith surrounded by a serpentine pattern of walks and trails. The second area is a grass meadow and provides a tranquil refuge for reflection and rejuvenation of the spirit. The trails are shaded by a grove of hundreds of white pine and dogwood trees, and framed by azaleas and rhododendron. The memorial overlooks the Potomac River with a vista of the city of Washington.

Visitors may listen to a recording made by Lady Bird Johnson at the entrance to the park facing The Pentagon. In the recording, the former First Lady talks about the creation of the park, the trees, and the views of major Washington D.C. landmarks.

History

Former President Lyndon B. Johnson died on January 22, 1973. Soon after, Johnson's admirers proposed constructing a statue in Washington, D.C., in his memory, but concern that it would be defaced led to rejection of that idea. Brooke Astor and Laurence Vanderbilt suggested a grove of trees instead, and planning for the $2 million grove began in Spring 1973. Lady Bird Johnson Park was chosen as the site of the grove due to Johnson's love of the park and its panoramic views of Washington, D.C. and its monuments on the National Mall and elsewhere while he was president.

The national memorial was authorized by Congress on December 28, 1973, and administratively listed on the National Register of Historic Places the same day.

By February 1975, $1.3 million for the memorial grove had been raised. A $15 silver medal and a $350 gold medal were designed in early 1975 and sold to help raise another $150,000. Plans for the grove were largely complete by May 1975. Landscape architect Meade Palmer designed the grove, which included a contemplative meadow and a small granite plaza among some trees. The grove covered , and would be planted with white pine, dogwood trees, and flowering shrubs and bushes. Stone carver Harold Vogel worked the exterior of the stone to give it a dynamic, rough-hewn look reminiscent of Johnson's personality. The Department of Geological Sciences at the University of Texas estimated the rock's age at a billion years. A flagstone walkway winding through the grove was included in the design. Four quotes from Johnson's public speeches, selected by Lady Bird Johnson, were carved into flagstones placed around the orthostat. But $600,000 was still needed in May 1975 to complete the memorial.

The orthostat was delivered to the site in August 1974, and emplaced on August 13, 1975. In December 1975, Congress authorized $1 million to complete the memorial grove and establish a maintenance fund.

The memorial was dedicated on April 6, 1976. It is administered by the National Park Service, as part of the George Washington Memorial Parkway.

A $500,000 footbridge between the memorial and a 30-car parking lot along Boundary Channel was constructed to make it easier to visit the Grove. The bridge was designed by landscape architect Meade Palmer and dedicated by Lady Bird Johnson on Oct 12, 1977.

See also
 List of national memorials of the United States
 Presidential memorials in the United States

References

 The National Parks: Index 2001–2003. Washington: U.S. Department of the Interior.

External links

 NPS.gov: Official Lyndon Baines Johnson Memorial Grove on the Potomac website

Johnson
Memorial Grove
George Washington Memorial Parkway
Monuments and memorials in Virginia
Monuments and memorials in Washington, D.C.
National Memorials of the United States
National Park Service areas in Virginia
National Park Service areas in Washington, D.C.
Monuments and memorials on the National Register of Historic Places in Virginia
Monuments and memorials on the National Register of Historic Places in Washington, D.C.
Protected areas established in 1973
1973 establishments in Washington, D.C.